Ram Nagar is Located in Central Coimbatore. It is located between Gandhipuram, Tatabad, Grey Town and RS Puram....  Famous women's association WOBEDA. is operated from here. The RASHTRIYA SWAYAMSEWAK SANGH Office is also located in Ramnagar.

Localities

The Specialty of this area is all the street names hold the name of leaders of India. Following are the roads in Ram Nagar.
North-South Roads:
 Patel Road
 Vivekanandha Road
 Rajaji Road (Kannan Departmental Stores, Shri Krishna Sweets, Suburban Schools are Located here)
 Gokale Road
 Kalingarayan Road (XIC-Xplore It Corp (www.xploreitcorp.com).IT/ITES Training provider,(IT Training and Development), Srinivaspuram Market, Banana Slice, ABT X Offices are Located here)
Sengupta street(Appin Coimbatore (www.appincoimbatore.com)

East-West Roads:
 Ansari Street
 Sengupta Street
 Sarojini Street
 Sastri Road
 Kalidas Road
 Sathyamoorthy Road(Ayyappan pooja sangham)
 Nehru Road
Swarnambika Layout

List of Hotels in Ramnagar area:
 Hotel Srri Aswini Deluxe (3 star)
 Hotel Aswini Lodge
 Hotel KK Residency
 Avinashi Suites
 Prince Garden
 Vijay Park Inn
 Hotel City Tower (2 star)
 Heritage Inn (3 star)
 Hotel Alankar Grandé (3 star)
 Velan Food Park
 Hotel Mangala International
 Junior kuppana
 Hotel sigadi

References 

Neighbourhoods in Coimbatore